William McKay (24 August 1906 – June 1977) was a Scottish footballer who played for Bolton Wanderers and Manchester United in the 1930s. He also played for East Stirlingshire, Hamilton Academical and Stalybridge Celtic. He helped Manchester United to win promotion out of the Football League Second Division in 1935–36 (as champions) and 1937–38.

Career
McKay began his career with Shotts Battlefield, and played in the Scottish Football League for East Stirlingshire and Hamilton Academical, before moving down to England to play for Bolton Wanderers in December 1929. Bolton were a struggling First Division club, finishing 15th in 1929–30, 14th in 1930–31, and 17th in 1931–32, before being relegated in 21st place in 1932–33. The "Trotters" finished one place and one point outside the Second Division promotion places in 1933–34. Remaining at Burnden Park for close to just over four years, he scored 17 goals in 104 league appearances.

McKay joined Manchester United in March 1934. He helped United to avoid relegation from the Second Division at the tail end of the 1933–34 season, and rise up the table to fifth position in 1934–35. He was part of the successful promotion campaign of 1935–36, as United won the Second Division title. However they were relegated straight back down to the Second Division the following season, but McKay's four goals in four games at the end of the 1937–38 season helped the club regain to secure second place and therefore regain their First Division status. The "Red Devils" then finished 14th in 1938–39.

McKay's career was disrupted by the Second World War, which put an end to the Football League in the first half of the 1940s, though he did turn out for Manchester United in their wartime games. During the war he also made guest appearances for Stockport County and Port Vale, playing in Port Vale's 4–2 defeat by rivals Stoke City at The Old Recreation Ground.

He was transferred to Cheshire County League club Stalybridge Celtic when football resumed in 1946, his 40-year-old body presumably not fit for action at Old Trafford. During his United career, he played in 182 games and scored 15 goals over all competitions.

Career statistics
Source:

Honours
Manchester United
Football League Second Division: 1935–36
Football League Second Division promotion: 1937–38

References

1906 births
1977 deaths
Footballers from North Lanarkshire
Scottish footballers
East Stirlingshire F.C. players
Hamilton Academical F.C. players
Bolton Wanderers F.C. players
Manchester United F.C. players
Stockport County F.C. wartime guest players
Port Vale F.C. wartime guest players
Stalybridge Celtic F.C. players
Scottish Football League players
English Football League players
Association football inside forwards
Association football wing halves
Scottish Junior Football Association players